DOQ may refer:

 Digital orthophoto quadrangle - type of aerial photography or satellite imagery
 Denominación de Origen - regulatory classification system primarily for Spanish wines 
 Priorat (DOQ) - a Spanish Denominación de Origen Calificada
 ISO 639:d - code for Dominican Sign Language
 DNS over QUIC - a expansion of the DNS standard, wants to combine DoH and DOT